Pres may refer to:

Abbreviations
President
Pressure
Presbyterian
Pres, glossing abbreviation for the present tense

Acronyms
Posterior reversible encephalopathy syndrome
French centers for research and higher education (Pôles de recherche et d'enseignement supérieur)
Postgraduate Research Experience Survey

People
 "Pres" or "Prez", nickname for American jazz tenor saxophonist Lester Young (1909–1959)
 J. Presper Eckert (1919–1995) American electrical engineer and computer pioneer
 Presnell Pres Mull (1922–2005), American college football player and head coach
 Priscillano Pres Romanillos (1963–2010), Hollywood animator
 Preston Pres Slack (1908–1993), American National Basketball Association player

Other uses
Pres Dillard, male lead character in the 1938 film Jezebel, played by Henry Fonda
Presentation Brothers College, Cork, colloquially known as Pres

See also 
Les Prés, a commune in France
Terrence Des Pres (1939–1987), American writer and Holocaust scholar
Josette du Pres, a fictional character in the TV series Dark Shadows
Leo du Pres, a fictional character in the soap opera All My Children
Prez (disambiguation)

Lists of people by nickname
Hypocorisms